The Daily Negro Times was a short-lived African-American newspaper published in New York by Marcus Garvey in 1922. Garvey bought a second hand newspaper press on which to print the paper and equipped the editorial office with a United Press ticker tape, probably the first African-American newspaper to have such a facility.

Garvey appointed himself Executive Editor and his team consisted of:
 Timothy Thomas Fortune, Editor
 Ulysses S. Poston, Managing Editor
 William Alexander Stephenson, News Editor
 Joel Augustus Rogers News sub-editor
 John Edward Bruce, Journalist
 Hucheshwar Gurusidha Mudgal, Journalist
 Robert Lincoln Poston, Journalist

References

1922 disestablishments in New York (state)
1922 establishments in New York City
Defunct African-American newspapers
Defunct newspapers published in New York City
Publications disestablished in 1922
Publications established in 1922
African-American newspapers published in New York (state)